Prospect was an electoral district of the House of Assembly in the Australian state of South Australia from 1938 to 1956.

The seat of Prospect was abolished and replaced by the new seat of Enfield for the 1956 election.

The current Prospect booths are marginal Labor, with the suburb represented by the marginal Liberal seat of Adelaide up to Regency Road, with the small northern remainder of Prospect represented by the fairly safe Labor seat of Enfield.

Members

Election results

References 

Former electoral districts of South Australia
1938 establishments in Australia
1956 disestablishments in Australia